Ludwik Abramowicz (8 May 1888 – 5 April 1966) was a Polish-Lithuanian activist and teacher.

Born in Radviliškis, he studied at the University of Kyiv. In 1918, he was working as a Lithuanian language teacher at a gymnasium in Telšiai, which was establishing independence from the Russian Empire during the time. Later in the interbellum period he became the director of one of the four Polish high schools in interwar Lithuania, the Adam Mickiewicz Gymnasium in Kaunas. After the Soviet invasion, he was briefly a burmister of Telšiai. From 1945 to 1947, he worked in a repatriation office in Vilnius before moving to Poland. He died in Warsaw in 1966.

References

1888 births
1966 deaths
People from Radviliškis
People from Shavelsky Uyezd
Polish activists
Polish schoolteachers
Lithuanian schoolteachers
Lithuanian people of Polish descent
People from the Russian Empire of Polish descent
Soviet emigrants to Poland
19th-century Polish educators
19th-century Lithuanian educators